The 1988 Indianapolis Colts season was the 36th season for the team in the National Football League (NFL) and fifth in Indianapolis. The team finished the year with a record of 9 wins and 7 losses, and tied for second in the AFC East division with the New England Patriots. However, the Colts finished ahead of New England based on better record against common opponents (7–5 to Patriots' 6–6).

Offseason

NFL Draft

Personnel

Staff

Roster

Regular season

Schedule

Game summaries

Week 4

Week 9 vs Broncos

Standings

Awards and records 
 Eric Dickerson, Led AFC (tied), Touchdowns, 15 TD's

External links

See also 
 History of the Indianapolis Colts
 List of Indianapolis Colts seasons
 Colts–Patriots rivalry

References 

Indianapolis Colts
Indianapolis Colts seasons
Baltimore